The 2000 Pacific hurricane season was an above-average Pacific hurricane season, although most of the storms were weak and short-lived. There were few notable storms this year. Tropical storms Miriam, Norman, and Rosa all made landfall in Mexico with minimal impact. Hurricane Daniel briefly threatened the U.S. state of Hawaii while weakening. Hurricane Carlotta was the strongest storm of the year and the second-strongest June hurricane in recorded history. Carlotta killed 18 people when it sank a freighter. Overall, the season was significantly more active than the previous season, with 19 tropical storms. In addition, six hurricanes developed. Furthermore, there were total of two major hurricanes (Category 3 or greater on the Saffir–Simpson hurricane wind scale).

The season officially started on May 15 in the Eastern Pacific, and on June 1 in the Central Pacific; they both ended on November 30, 2000. These dates conventionally delimit the period of each year when most tropical cyclones form in the Pacific basin. However, the formation of tropical cyclones is possible at any time of the year; despite this, there were no off-season tropical cyclones this year. Seasonal activity began on May 22, when Hurricane Aletta formed off the southwest coast of Mexico. Two storms formed in June, though the season slowly became active in July when three named storms developed, including Hurricane Daniel, which was the second-strongest storm of the season. August was the most active month of the year, with six named storms forming, including hurricanes Gilma and Hector. September was a relatively quiet month with two storms, one of which was Hurricane Lane. Two storms developed in October including Tropical Storm Olivia, while the final named storm, Tropical Storm Rosa, formed in November.



Seasonal summary 

The accumulated cyclone energy (ACE) index for the 2000 Pacific hurricane season as calculated by Colorado State University using data from the National Hurricane Center was 96 units. Broadly speaking, ACE is a measure of the power of a tropical or subtropical storm multiplied by the length of time it existed.

The season officially started on May 15, 2000, in the eastern Pacific, and on June 1, 2000, in the central Pacific, and lasted until November 30, 2000. These dates conventionally delimit the period of each year when most tropical cyclones form in the northeastern Pacific Ocean. This season had an above average number of storms. However, it had a below-average number of hurricanes and major hurricanes. There were also two tropical depressions that did not reach storm strength. In the central Pacific, two tropical storms formed. The first storm formed on May 22 and the last storm dissipated on November 8.

Systems

Hurricane Aletta 

A tropical wave crossed Central America and entered the Gulf of Tehuantepec on May 20. Deep convection developed near the center of the disturbance, and the system became the first tropical depression of the season on May 22 while located south of Acapulco, Mexico. A mid-level ridge forced a west-northwest track away from the Mexican coast. As it turned westward, it continued a slow intensification trend, before strengthening more quickly due to decreased wind shear. After maintaining peak winds for about 18 hours, Aletta began a weakening trend due to increasing wind shear. At around the same time, a trough eroded the ridge that was steering the movement of Aletta, causing the hurricane to remain almost stationary for the next two days. The lack of motion resulted in upwelling which imparted additional weakening, and Aletta dropped to tropical storm status on May 27. It quickly deteriorated that day, and on May 28 the system dissipated well south of Cabo San Lucas after it began a slow north drift. The remnants lingered in the same area for the next several days.

Hurricane Aletta was the second-strongest May hurricane by pressure, as well as the fourth strongest May hurricane by winds.

Tropical Storm Bud 

The tropical wave that eventually became Tropical Storm Bud was first identified off the coast of Africa on May 22. It moved across the Atlantic Ocean and Caribbean, then into the eastern Pacific Ocean on June 6 with little development. The tropical wave remained disorganized until June 11 when a broad low-pressure area developed southwest of Acapulco, Mexico. The wave was only intensifying slowly, and on June 13, it became strong enough to be designated as a tropical depression. It quickly strengthened to tropical storm intensity six hours later, and moved to the northwest. It was forecast to strengthen to a strong tropical storm with winds reaching , but the storm only reached a peak intensity of  early on June 14. Bud turned to the north-northwest, and slowly weakened from June 15 onwards, due to increasing vertical wind shear and cooler ocean water temperatures. The storm's forward speed decreased and began to meander, as the ridge to the north of Bud weakened and a trough developed over the western United States. It drifted erratically while located just north of Socorro Island, and was downgraded to a tropical depression on June 16. By the next day, the depression degenerated into an area of low pressure, which persisted until June 19.

However, no reports of damage or casualties were received.

Hurricane Carlotta 

A tropical wave left the coast of Africa on June 3. It entered the East Pacific on June 12 and spawned a weak low four days later. It remained disorganized until developing a concentration of deep convection on June 18, and the low became Tropical Depression Three-E by 18:00 UTC that day. It strengthened into Tropical Storm Carlotta six hours later. Moving generally westward at about 11 knots (13 mph), Carlotta developed a ragged banding eye surrounded by deep convection late on June 19, and became a hurricane at 6:00 UTC on the 20th. Carlotta began to rapidly intensify shortly after becoming a hurricane, with its winds increasing by 80 mph in just 24 hours, and it reached peak intensity at 6:00 UTC on the 21st with  winds. Shortly thereafter, Carlotta turned to the west-northwest, slowing slightly, around the edge of a mid-tropospheric ridge over Mexico. It quickly weakened during this time, down to 100 knots (115 mph) by 00:00 UTC on June 22. Oscillating eye definition that day caused Carlotta to fluctuate in intensity until it resumed weakening on June 23, falling to tropical storm status on June 24 as it moved more quickly towards cooler waters. Diminishing convection caused Carlotta to weaken to tropical depression intensity by 00:00 UTC on June 25, and it dissipated six hours later. A remnant swirl of low clouds persisted for several days afterward.

Though it never made landfall, Carlotta killed 18 people when it sank the Lithuanian freighter M/V Linkuva. Carlotta is also the third-most intense June tropical cyclone in the east Pacific; only Ava of 1973 and Celia of 2010 were stronger.

Tropical Depression Four-E 

Tropical Depression Four-E formed from the same tropical wave that spawned Tropical Depression Two in the Atlantic Ocean. The tropical wave crossed Central America between June 30 and July 1, continuing to move westward into the Pacific Ocean. The wave became more organized on July 6 and the National Hurricane Center started issuing advisories on the newly developed tropical depression later that day. The NHC initially predicted that the depression would reach tropical storm intensity, as there was a lack of vertical wind shear around the system and sea surface temperatures were warm enough for intensification to occur. The depression lacked any deep convection, however, and it began weakening On July 7. The depression entered an area of stronger wind shear and dissipated that day.

Tropical Storm Upana 

A tropical wave organized into Tropical Depression One-C on July 20 while located southeast of the Hawaiian Islands. It strengthened slowly and moved nearly due west, before reaching storm strength later on July 20. The storm was named Upana, which is Hawaiian for "Urban". The storm had no deep convection in its circulation on July 22, and was downgraded to a tropical depression in the afternoon. Late on July 23, deep convection flared up, briefly strengthening the system again, but failed to re-gain tropical storm status, as it remained poorly organized. It dissipated on July 24, despite a low-shear environment favorable for development. Upana's remnants continued moving to the west, where JMA classified its remnants as a tropical depression while it was still east of the International Date Line on July 27. It crossed the into the West Pacific shortly afterward. The remnants were re-designated as Tropical Depression 12W by the JTWC, and later re-strengthened into a tropical storm and was named Chanchu. Chanchu moved north, and had dissipated by July 30.

Upana is the first storm in the Central Pacific Hurricane Center's area of responsibility to be named in July, and the first tropical storm to develop in the region since Tropical Storm Paka in the 1997 season.

Tropical Depression Five-E 

The origins of Tropical Depression Five-E were first identified on July 8 when a tropical wave moved off the west African coast. It entered the eastern Pacific Ocean on July 16 after tracking over the Caribbean Sea. The wave developed to a tropical depression on July 22. Lacking significant deep convection and moving over cold waters, Five-E never intensified further to a tropical storm. The depression dissipated late on July 23, just one day after it formed.

Hurricane Daniel 

A tropical wave departed the western African coast on July 8. The wave crossed the Atlantic and Central America uneventfully. However, on July 23, while in the East Pacific, the wave's weather became well-organized, and it developed into a tropical depression that day. After reaching tropical storm intensity, the system was named Daniel, and it became a hurricane the next day. Rapid intensification brought Daniel to its peak as a Category 3 hurricane on July 25. Afterwards, the storm fluctuated in intensity until it weakened to a tropical storm on July 30. Daniel slowed, turned northwestward, and passed 120 nautical miles north of Hawaii the next day. Accelerating, Daniel weakened to a tropical depression on August 3 and dissipated two days later.

No casualties or damaged was reported in association with Hurricane Daniel, despite the system's passing close enough to Hawaii to require tropical storm warnings. It still produced heavy surf conditions along the northern shores of the Hawaiian Islands. Daniel was the first tropical cyclone to be a significant threat to Hawaii since 1994.

Tropical Storm Emilia 

On July 11, a tropical wave moved off the African coast, and moved to the Lesser Antilles one week later. It passed over Central America near Panama on July 22 without any increase in organization. On July 25, the wave began to show curved banding, showing that it had become better organized. It intensified to a tropical depression on July 26 while located south southwest of Manzanillo, Mexico, designated as Tropical Depression Seven-E. The depression was upgraded to Tropical Storm Emilia later that day while moving northwest, steered by a mid-level ridge to its north. During this time, Emilia was forecast to strengthen to a hurricane within two days, due to the system moving over warm waters. However, late on July 27, the storm began to accelerate, meaning that it will move into cooler waters sooner than firstly anticipated, therefore, only allowing the storm to intensify within a few hours before weakening. A few hours later, the storm moved into cooler waters and drier air, and Emilia's deep convection dissipated, weakening the storm. Late on July 28 deep convection redeveloped near the storm's center, but wind shear prevented Emilia from strengthening. It turned to the west and weakened below tropical storm intensity on July 29, as the deep convection in the storm diminished again. It shortly dissipated while located several hundred miles west south-west of Cabo San Lucas, Mexico.

Tropical Storm Fabio 

A tropical wave moved off the west coast of Africa on July 19, and entered into the Pacific on July 27. Minimal development occurred in the west-northwestward moving wave until August 1. It was then that the tropical wave began developing a low-level circulation and convective organization was seen to the south of Manzanillo, Colima, Mexico. As the depression had curved westward, it had intensified enough to be upgraded to Tropical Storm Fabio. Despite the presence of wind shear, Fabio continued to strengthen and reach a peak intensity of  later that day. Fabio turned toward west-southwest while weakening on August 5. The remnant swirl of low clouds persisted for several more days, eventually undergoing a Fujiwhara interaction with the remains of Hurricane Gilma.

Hurricane Gilma 

Gilma's precursor was a tropical wave that moved off the African coast on July 20 or 21. The wave entered the East Pacific on August 2, and the formation of a well-defined center led to the formation of a depression on August 5, 250 nautical miles south of Manzanillo, Mexico. The system strengthened into a tropical storm at 12:00 UTC that day, at which point it became known as Gilma. Gilma gradually intensified and became a hurricane on August 8 at 6:00 UTC. Gilma reached peak intensity six hours later and moved over cooler waters. Gilma steadily weakened thereafter, and became a tropical depression again at 00:00 UTC on August 10. The cyclone lost any significant convection at 18:00 UTC on the same day, and dissipated six hours later.

Hurricane Hector 

In the middle of August, two tropical storms developed off the Mexican coastline. Hector, the first, became a tropical depression at 18:00 UTC on August 10, and developed banding features late the next day and strengthened into a tropical storm. Hector moved generally westward under the influence of a strong ridge, developed a central dense overcast and a ragged eye, and became a hurricane on August 14. Hector reached peak intensity 12 hours later. Hector then weakened and dissipated over colder water southwest of Baja California. The remnants of Hector passed over the Hawaiian Islands several days later, producing heavy rain over most of the island chain.

Tropical Storm Ileana 

A tropical wave emerged from the African coast on the first day of August. The wave crossed Central America and southern Mexico into the Eastern Pacific, and on August 13, a 12:21 UTC QuikSCAT scan revealed a low-level circulation, and it was designated as a tropical depression. Early the next day, the depression strengthened into a 40 mph tropical storm named Ileana. Tropical Storm Ileana paralleled the Mexican coast and reached peak intensity as a high-end tropical storm early on August 15 with 70 mph winds. The storm maintained this intensity for 18 hours before passing just south of the Baja California Peninsula, turning west, and weakening to a tropical depression late on August 16. It dissipated early the next day, but the remnant low-level circulation persisted until August 20.

Tropical Storm Wene 

A tropical disturbance developed in the Western Pacific Ocean along the eastern periphery of the monsoon trough in mid-August. It moved eastward along the west–east-oriented surface pressure trough, and crossed the International Date Line later on August 15. Abnormally warm sea surface temperatures allowed the system to intensify despite its unusually high latitude, and it became Tropical Storm Wene on August 16. Wene continued to weaken, and dissipated when the storm merged with an extratropical cyclone.

As a depression, Wene was the first Western Pacific tropical cyclone to cross the dateline since the 1996 season. The name Wene is Hawaiian for "Wayne". The system formed at the second-northernmost latitude of any storm in the East Pacific basin.

Tropical Storm John 

John originated on August 28 from an area of disturbed weather that was associated with the Intertropical Convergence Zone (ITCZ) near just outside the Central Pacific basin. Developing near the Central Pacific basin, John eventually entered early on August 30 and was then also monitored by the Central Pacific Hurricane Center. that was a tropical storm for several days and moved from the eastern to the central Pacific basin. Thereafter entering the central Pacific region, Tropical Storm John approached hurricane status while meandering erratically east-southeast of Hawaii. John eventually encountered strong wind shear, and dissipated on September 1. Tropical Storm John did not cause any damage or fatalities, as there were no reports of any land being affected.

Tropical Storm Kristy 

Part of the same tropical wave that spawned Tropical Storm Chris in the Atlantic uneventfully crossed the rest of the Atlantic and passed far out to sea into the Pacific before it organized into Tropical Depression Fourteen-E on August 31. Despite significant shear, the depression strengthened into Tropical Storm Kristy as it meandered far from land over the open ocean. Wind shear then dissipated the system on September 3, just 210 kilometers from where it first formed.

Hurricane Lane 

The precursor to Lane was a tropical wave that formed in the Atlantic Ocean on August 20. The wave moved across the Atlantic basin without development and crossed Central America on August 29. By September 1, the system was beginning to organize south of Mexico. The next day the tropical depression became Tropical Storm Lane. After becoming a tropical storm, Lane executed a counter-clockwise loop, during that maneuver, the storm crossed its own wake and weakened slightly. After the storm finished the loop, it continued to move westward where it reached hurricane strength on September 9 while passing over Socorro Island. By September 11, Lane encountered cooler waters which weakened the hurricane back to tropical storm strength. Lane then encountered a trough that had formed off the western United States coastline. The interaction with the system caused Lane to curve northeast towards the West Coast of the United States. On September 13, Lane passed over cooler waters, causing it to weaken to a tropical depression. Lane then dissipated on the next day.

On September 9, forecasters predicted that the storm would remain offshore and its rainbands would bring heavy rains and gusty winds across the Baja California. However, because forecasters predicted that the storm would stay offshore, and so no warnings or watches were issued. Lane passed directly over Socorro Island where a weather station recorded a pressure of 973 mb. Although the center of Lane was well offshore, it still brought heavy surf that closed several ports in Mexico. Lane remnants then affected the Western United States. The moisture from Lane produced thunderstorms in California. At all locations, effects were minimal, with no reports of damage or casualties.

Tropical Storm Miriam 

A tropical wave moved off the coast of Africa on August 29. It remained weak as it moved westward across the Atlantic Ocean, and entered the Pacific Ocean on September 9. Banding features became more pronounced, though convection remained intermittent. On September 16, the depression briefly became Tropical Storm Miriam, though quickly weakened back to a tropical depression as it continued north-northwestward. Tropical storm force winds were never reported, and it is possible Miriam never attained tropical storm status.

Total damages from the storm amounted to $7.2 million (MXN; $558,000 in 2000 USD$,  in  USD). By October 24, a national disaster declaration was signed for areas affected by Tropical Storm Miriam in Baja California Sur.

Tropical Storm Norman 

The same tropical wave that spawned Atlantic Hurricane Gordon organized into an area of low pressure in the Eastern Pacific Ocean on September 18. Weak steering currents forced the depression to drift slowly northward, and later on September 20 it strengthened into Tropical Storm Norman. Norman quickly reached peak winds of  before making landfall in western Mexico. The storm rapidly weakened to a tropical depression over land, but Norman maintained its circulation and some deep convection as it turned to the northwest. It emerged over water on September 22, but turned to the northeast, made landfall again in Mexico, and dissipated later that day.

In all, Norman caused $13.3 million (2000 USD; $  USD) in damage.

Tropical Storm Olivia 

A tropical wave left the African coast on September 16. Crossing into the East Pacific on September 28, the wave exhibited little thunderstorm activity until it developed a burst of deep convection late on September 30. The development of banding features and sustained winds of 20-25 knots (25-30 mph) allowed it to develop into Tropical Depression Seventeen-E at 12:00 UTC on October 2. It strengthened into Tropical Storm Olivia eighteen hours later. Moving west-northwestward away from Mexico, Olivia reached its peak intensity late on October 3 with 55-knot (65 mph) winds, a minimum pressure of 994 millibars. It maintained this intensity for 36 hours before an increase in wind shear caused by Atlantic Hurricane Keith caused it to weaken on October 5. After Keith made landfall on Mexico and dissipated, northeasterly shear relaxed, and allowed Olivia to re-strengthen and achieve 55-knot winds again early on October 8. Continual westward movement brought the storm over cooler waters, and it began to weaken for a second time. Olivia dropped to tropical depression intensity at 6:00 UTC on October 9, and dissipated 24 hours later. The resulting remnant low briefly re-gained moderate convection on October 11, but increasing southwesterly shear disrupted it. The low eventually crossed the Baja California Peninsula and the Gulf of California, and tracked across northwestern Mexico and entered the southwest United States.

The remnants of Olivia brought considerable rainfall to the American Southwest, Northwestern Mexico, and the Baja California Peninsula, exceeding 3 inches in many areas.

Tropical Storm Paul 

An area of disturbed weather emerged from the Intertropical Convergence Zone on October 22. Located several hundred miles south-southeast of the Gulf of Tehuantepec, convection gradually organized and increased, and by October 25 satellite images indicated the development of the eighteenth tropical depression of the season. Operationally it was not classified until 15 hours later. The depression moved westward throughout its duration, and based on Dvorak estimates, intensified into Tropical Storm Paul on October 26.

As wind shear increased and convection became disorganized, Paul weakened. A trough briefly curved it to the northwest, before resuming its westward motion. Although the convection was becoming displaced from the low-level circulation, the National Hurricane Center continued to predict strengthening. However, the thunderstorms became minimal, and Paul weakened to a tropical depression early on October 28. The circulation center deteriorated, and although there were bursts in convection, Paul dissipated early on October 29, as it was becoming indistinguishable in the ITCZ. The remnants continued westward, and interacted with an upper-level low, affecting Hawaii with heavy rainfall in early November. That rainfall total makes Paul the third rainiest tropical cyclone in Hawaii, behind only Hurricane Hiki and Hurricane Lane of 1950 and 2018, respectively.

Tropical Storm Rosa 

The origins of Tropical Storm Rosa can be traced to a tropical wave that moved off the coast of Africa on October 18. It showed signs of development in the southwestern Caribbean Sea, though moved into the East Pacific Ocean on November 1 before being able to develop further. A ridge of high pressure to its north forced the depression westward, where it slowly organized into a tropical storm on November 5. A mid-level trough eroded the high-pressure system, allowing Rosa to turn more to the north.

Rosa dropped moderate rainfall across Mexico, peaking at  near the Mexico/Guatemala border. Damage was minimal, totaling to only $15,000 (2000 USD; $  USD). Rosa was the first November storm since Hurricane Rick in the 1997 season.

Other storms

Tropical Depression Chanchu 

On July 26, a tropical depression formed east of the International Date Line from the possible remnants of Upana, and it quickly exited the Central Pacific Hurricane Center's area of responsibility. However, this storm was not included in the CPHC database. As it crossed into the western Pacific, it strengthened into a tropical storm and received the name Chanchu.

Season effects 
This is a table of all the storms that formed in the 2000 Pacific hurricane season. It includes their duration, names, intensities, areas affected, damages, and death totals. Deaths in parentheses are additional and indirect (an example of an indirect death would be a traffic accident), but were still related to that storm. Damage and deaths include totals while the storm was extratropical, a wave, or a low, and all the damage figures are in 2000 USD.

Storm names 
The following names were used for named storms that formed in the eastern Pacific in 2000. Names that were not assigned are marked in gray No names were retired, so it was used again in the 2006 Pacific hurricane season. This is the same list used for the 1994 season.

For storms that form in the Central Pacific Hurricane Center's area of responsibility, encompassing the area between 140 degrees west and the International Date Line, all names are used in a series of four rotating lists. The next four names that were slated for use in 2000 are shown below, however only two of them were used.

See also 

 Pacific hurricane
 List of Pacific hurricanes
 2000 Atlantic hurricane season
 2000 Pacific typhoon season
 2000 North Indian Ocean cyclone season
 South-West Indian Ocean cyclone seasons: 1999–2000, 2000–01
 Australian region cyclone seasons: 1999–2000, 2000–01
 South Pacific cyclone seasons: 1999–2000, 2000–01

Notes

References

External links 

 National Hurricane Center Website
 National Hurricane Center's Eastern Pacific Tropical Weather Outlook
 Servicio Meteorológico Nacional Website 
 Joint Typhoon Warning Center 
 NHC 2000 Pacific hurricane season archive
 HPC 2000 Tropical Cyclone Rainfall Pages

 
2002
2000 EPac